Heath L'Estrange (born 21 May 1985), also known by the nickname of "Stranger", is an Australian former professional rugby league footballer. He played for the Sydney Roosters, Manly Warringah Sea Eagles and the St. George Illawarra Dragons in the National Rugby League, and the Bradford Bulls in the Super League. In his rugby league career, he won the 2008 NRL Grand Final with the Sea Eagles.

Background
L'Estrange was born in Sydney, New South Wales, Australia.

While attending Terra Sancta College, L'Estrange played for the Australian Schoolboys team in 2002 and 2003.

Playing career

Sydney Roosters: 2004-2007
L'Estrange signed for the club in late 2003. He made his first grade début on 9 April 2004 against the Brisbane Broncos during round 5 at Aussie Stadium where he scored two tries.

L'Estrange played in the 2006 NSW Cup grand final for Newtown who were the Sydney Roosters feeder club at the time against Parramatta.  Newtown would lose the grand final 20-19 at Stadium Australia.

Manly-Warringah Sea Eagles: 2008-09
L'Estrange played in the 2008 NRL Grand Final victory over the Melbourne Storm.  Manly won the match 40-0 which as of the 2019 season is the biggest winning margin in a grand final.

Bradford Bulls: 2010-13
L'Estrange signed a two-year contract with Super League club Bradford Bulls for 2010; he was seen as a replacement for Terry Newton. L'Estrange re-signed with Bradford for a three-year deal midway through the 2011 season. After the 2013 season he was released from his contract on compassionate grounds where he would later sign a one-year contract with the Sydney Roosters.

Sydney Roosters: 2014
The Sydney Roosters signed L'Estrange after he was released by Bradford. On 29 October, L'Estrange signed a one- year deal with the St. George Illawarra Dragons for the 2015 NRL season.

St George Illawarra Dragons: 2015
On 2 October, L'Estrange announced his retirement from first grade rugby league.

Hills District Bulls
On 28 August 2017, L'Estrange was named in the 2017 Ron Massey Cup team of the year.

Representative

France 
He was named in the France squad for the Rugby League World Cup 2008.

Exiles 
L'Estrange played two games for the Exiles.

References

External links
2015 St. George Illawarra Dragons profile

1985 births
Living people
Australian people of French descent
Australian expatriate sportspeople in England
Australian rugby league players
Bradford Bulls captains
Bradford Bulls players
Exiles rugby league team players
Illawarra Cutters players
Manly Warringah Sea Eagles players
Prime Minister's XIII players
Rugby league hookers
Rugby league players from Sydney
St. George Illawarra Dragons players
Sunshine Coast Sea Eagles players
Sydney Roosters players